La Sure en Chartreuse is a commune in the department of Isère, southeastern France. The municipality was established on 1 January 2017 by merger of the former communes of Saint-Julien-de-Raz (the seat) and Pommiers-la-Placette.

See also 
Communes of the Isère department

References 

Communes of Isère